Gerald Toto (born 1967) is a French lyricist, composer, performer, multi-instrumentalist and artistic director.

Music career
Toto was born, Saint-Cloud, France. Part of the underground scene in the middle of the 1990s, he chose a new direction by becoming the artistic director and composer of the first album of the well known Faudel (writing songs such as "Tellement je t'aime")

On the heels of the commercial success Gerald Toto released his first album, Les Premiers Jours (Warner, 1998), a mix between cashew music and the music of Daniel Lanois.

Then came Middle Eastern electro with the band Smadj and the vocal improvisations of "Toto Bona Lokua" with Richard Bona and Lokua Kanza (No Format!, 2004).

In 2006 Toto came back with a new album, Kitchenette (V2music). He also contributed to Nouvelle Vague's album Bande à Part (Peacefrog, 2006), for which he did the covers "Don't Go" and "Heart of Glass".

His third album, Spring Fruits, with English lyrics, was released in 2011.

Discography
Les Premiers Jours (1998)
 Les Premiers Jours
 Y’en a qui
 Mademoiselle
 Bonne nuit
 Libellules
 Le vrai sauvage
 If 6 was 9
 Une scène d’amitié
 Et si
 Je nous aime
 L’éléphant
 Ta peau me manque
 La mélopée

Toto Bona Lokua (2004)
 Ghana Blues (Richard Bona)
 Kwalelo (Richard Bona)
 Lamuka (Lokua Kanza)
 L’endormie (Gérald Toto)
 Flutes (Gérald Toto)
 The front (Richard Bona)
 Na ye (Lokua Kanza)
 Help me (Gérald Toto)
 Stesuff (Lokua Kanza)
 Where i came from (Gérald Toto)
 Seven beats (Richard Bona)
 Lisanga (Lokua Kanza)

Kitchenette (2007)
 Par temps calme (Gérald Toto)
 Tes dessous (Gérald Toto / Gérald Toto – Mike Clinton – Jérôme Boirivant)
 Isabelle in love & pain (Gérald Toto / Gérald Toto – Paul Borg)
 En rose ou violet (Gérald Toto)
 Mamie Chatrou (Gérald Toto)
 Les copines (Gérald Toto)
 Buisson dormant (Gérald Toto)
 No man's land (Gérald Toto)
 L’eau martienne (Gérald Toto / Gérald Toto – Paul Borg)
 J’fais (Gérald Toto)
 Au cas où (Gérald Toto)
 Tears at the end (David Parker / Gérald Toto)
 Secrets culinaires (Gérald Toto)

[BONUS Kitchenette: Le Dessert]
CD Bonus's name is "Le dessert" :
 Sa nou Pe fe	 3:52
 Et Si	3:32
 Sa nou Pe fe – Version Flutes	3:23
 Buisson Dormant – Version Concert	4:39
 Eau Martienne – Version Acoustique	3:28
 Boulangerie	9:02
 EPK + Clip Sa Nou Pe Fe	30:51

Spring Fruits (2011)
avec Alice Orpheus, Janice Leca, Mike Pelanconi, Patrick Goraguer
 Chocolate Cake	 4:19
 Freedom	4:30
 My Child	4:42
 Killing Time	4:40
 Dive	3:13
 I Easily Get Lost	3:45
 On Your Own	2:39
 It's A Need	3:31
 Mister Postman	3:10
 Black Mary	3:21
 I Have To Admit It	2:21
 No Words	4:01

Notes

External links

 Site officiel
 Myspace officiel
 Myspace Spring Fruits officiel
 Myspace des copines !
 Facebook Page

French singer-songwriters
1967 births
Living people
English-language singers from France